Andriana Banova (born 1 May 1987 in Pleven) is a Bulgarian triple jumper. She competed in the triple jump event at the 2012 Summer Olympics.

Competition record

References

Sportspeople from Pleven
Bulgarian female triple jumpers
1987 births
Living people
Olympic athletes of Bulgaria
Athletes (track and field) at the 2012 Summer Olympics
World Athletics Championships athletes for Bulgaria